Oville is a locality located in the municipality of Boñar, in León province, Castile and León, Spain. As of 2020, it has a population of 20.

Geography 
Oville is located 55km north-northeast of León, Spain.

References

Populated places in the Province of León